The Ponds is a suburb of Sydney, in the state of New South Wales, Australia.

History
"The Ponds" was a name designed to reflect the geography of the area and was derived from the nearby creek called "Second Ponds Creek", and the growing population. The Ponds was officially designated as a separate suburb in January 2007. The Ponds had previously been part of the suburbs of Kellyville and Kellyville Ridge.

Population
In the 2016 Census, there were 11,731 people in The Ponds. 50.3% of people were born in Australia. The next most common countries of birth were India 14.3%, Philippines 4.3%, England 2.2%, Sri Lanka 2.2% and China 1.9%.  49.4% of people spoke only English at home. Other languages spoken at home included Punjabi 5.9%, Hindi 5.9%, Gujarati 2.9%, Mandarin 2.5% and Urdu 2.1%. The most common responses for religion were Catholic 24.9%, Hinduism 14.8%, No Religion 14.0%, Anglican 9.1% and Islam 8.3%.

According to data from the 2011 census, the Australian Bureau of Statistics ranked The Ponds as the most advantaged suburb of Sydney by the use of twenty-five variables, including income, internet access, number of bedrooms and resident qualifications. With more than 71 per cent of the population aged over 15 years married, census data shows that The Ponds has the highest percentage of married people per suburb in Australia.

Housing
The Ponds is situated in the North West growth corridor, where the first stage of a major shopping centre and commercial space have opened. A new suburb was designed to make the estate a new community. The first lots of land were released on 31 March 2007.

In 2012, The Ponds developed received two industry awards; taking out first place in the Residential Development and Sustainable Development categories at the UDIA NSW Austral Bricks Awards for Excellence.

Education
The Ponds has two primary schools, John Palmer Public School, which opened in 2008 and Riverbank Public School, which opened in 2015. The Ponds also has a high school, The Ponds High School, which opened in 2015. A "special needs" school, The Ponds School, also opened in 2015.

Hospitals
Hospitals nearby include Norwest Private, Westmead Hospital, The Children's Hospital at Westmead, Westmead Private, Mount Druitt Hospital, and Blacktown Hospital. In the near future, a hospital will be built in Rouse Hill, which will be less than a kilometre away.

Churches
There are a number of churches nearby, including The Church of Jesus Christ of Latter-day Saints, Every Nation Christian Church, Blessed John XXIII Catholic Church, Our Lady of the Rosary, Rouse Hill Anglican Church, The Salvation Army – Rouse Hill Region, Hillsong Church, NewHope Baptist Church and Life Anglican Church Quakers Hill.

Transport

Road 

The main roads in the ponds are The Ponds Boulevard, Riverbank Drive, Ridgeline Drive, Hambledon Road, Stanhope Parkway and Schofields Road. Both the Westlink M7 and the M2 Hills Motorway provide easy road access to the suburb from the south and east, respectively.

Bus 

The Ponds is serviced by Busways which provides services to Blacktown (734, 752), Rouse Hill (752), Schofields and Riverstone (734).

Rail 

Tallawong station on the North West Rail Line is the closest station to The Ponds, providing services every 4 minutes to Norwest Business Park, Castle Hill, Macquarie Park and Chatswood, with connecting Sydney Trains services to Sydney CBD. The line opened on 26 May 2019. Cooee Busways provides an on demand service connecting The Ponds with Tallawong and Rouse Hill stations, whilst route 752 connects The Ponds with Rouse Hill station.

The nearest Sydney Trains stations are located at Schofields and Quakers Hill with services to Blacktown, Parramatta, Richmond, Leppington and the Sydney central business district.

Shopping
The Ponds shopping centre opened in 2015 adjacent to John Palmer Public School. It contains Woolworths as the anchor tenant, a number of cafes and restaurants, a newsagency, a pharmacy and approximately 20 speciality shops as well as a car park.  It connects with the former sales and display centre which was renovated and turned into a community resource centre.

Rouse Hill Town Centre is located about 1 km away, and features over 250 stores in addition to Coles, Woolworths, Kmart, Big W and Reading Cinemas.

Stanhope Village is located 3 km from The Ponds, with Coles, Kmart, Aldi and several speciality stores.

Based on the data from Australia Post and StarTrack couriers, residents in The Ponds receive the most online purchases in NSW.

References

Suburbs of Sydney
City of Blacktown
Populated places established in 2007
2007 establishments in Australia